Stadion Krtoli is a football venue in Radovići at Luštica peninsula, Municipality of Tivat, Montenegro. It is used for football matches and is the home ground of FK Sloga Radovići.

History
The stadium is built at Krtoli village in 1968. Except the field and club's building, there is a small stand on one side, with a capacity of 500 seats. Investments' company Luštica Development, a main sponsor of FK Sloga, stated they will reconstruct stadium during 2017.

See also
FK Sloga Radovići
Luštica
Tivat

References

External links
Stadium information

Football venues in Montenegro
Football in Montenegro